Omar Abdullah was sworn in as Chief Minister of Jammu and Kashmir on 5 January 2009. The list of ministers:

Cabinet ministers
 Omar Abdullah (JKNC)  - Chief Minister
 Tara Chand (INC) - Deputy Chief Minister
 Peerzadas Mohmmad Sayeed
 Taj Mohideen
 Nawang Rigzin Jora (INC) -  Minister for Urban Development and Urban Local Bodies
 Shyam Lal Sharma
 Ali Mohammad Sagar (JKNC) - Minister for Rural Development
 Mian Altaf
 Surjeet Salathia
 Muhammad Akbar Lone (JKNC) - Minister for Higher Education
 Chowdhary Mohammad Ramzan
 Ajay Sadhotra
 Mir Saifullah
 Nazir Ahmed Khan Gurezi
 Feroz Ahmed Khan
 Sajjad Ahmed Kichloo
 Ajay Sadhotra
 Ghulam Ahmed Mir (INC)
 Abdul Majid Wani (INC)
 Waqar Rasool Wani (INC)

References

2009 in Indian politics
Indian National Congress
Jammu and Kashmir ministries
Jammu & Kashmir National Conference
2009 establishments in Jammu and Kashmir
2018 disestablishments in India
Cabinets established in 2009
Cabinets disestablished in 2014